Gebrael Haoui (born 26 June 1954) is a Lebanese sports shooter. He competed in the mixed skeet event at the 1984 Summer Olympics.

References

1954 births
Living people
Lebanese male sport shooters
Olympic shooters of Lebanon
Shooters at the 1984 Summer Olympics
Place of birth missing (living people)